Tiger Woods PGA Tour 2002 (also known as Tiger Woods PGA Tour Golf for the Game Boy Advance version) is a sports video game, developed by Headgate Studios for the Microsoft Windows and PlayStation 2 versions and Rebellion Developments for the GBA version, and published by EA Sports in 2001. It was the first edition of the series released for the Game Boy Advance.

Reception

The PC and PlayStation 2 versions received "favorable" reviews, while the Game Boy Advance version received "mixed" reviews according to video game review aggregator Metacritic.

References

External links

2002 video games
EA Sports games
Game Boy Advance games
Golf video games
Multiplayer and single-player video games
PlayStation 2 games
Tiger Woods video games
Video games developed in Canada
Windows games